Keith Alan Ridge (born 18 July 1934) is a former Australian politician who was a Liberal Party member of the Legislative Assembly of Western Australia from 1968 to 1980, representing the seat of Kimberley. He was a minister in the government of Sir Charles Court.

Ridge was born in Perth, and attended John Forrest High School. After leaving school, he worked as a clerk, serving as assistant secretary of the Quairading Road Board and then as clerk of the Shire of West Kimberley. At the 1968 state election, Ridge ran as the Liberal candidate for the seat of Kimberley, and defeated the sitting Labor member, John Rhatigan. He was the first non-Labor member for Kimberley for 44 years (since 1924). After the Liberals' victory at the 1974 state election, Ridge was appointed Minister for Lands and Minister for Forests in the new ministry formed by Sir Charles Court. In June 1975, he was also made Minister for Tourism, replacing Bill Grayden. The ministry was reshuffled after the 1977 election, and Ridge was appointed Minister for Health and Minister for Community Welfare. Following another reshuffle in August 1978, he was instead made Minister for Housing, with Ray Young taking over his previous portfolio. Ridge lost his seat to Labor's Ernie Bridge at the 1980 election.

References

|-

1934 births
Living people
Liberal Party of Australia members of the Parliament of Western Australia
Members of the Western Australian Legislative Assembly
Politicians from Perth, Western Australia
Western Australian local councillors